Stephanie Garber is an American author of young adult fiction known for the Caraval series.

Writing career 
Garber was a college resident director when she began writing in her spare time. She wrote several novels and received many rejections until her fourth book, a space opera, caught the interest of a literary agent. When the space opera failed to sell, Garber wrote Caraval. Garber has stated that she did not intend for Caraval to be the first book in a series or to be a romance when she started writing it. Two sequels, Legendary and Finale, complete the Caraval trilogy.

Her books have received mixed critical reception. Caraval received a starred review from Publishers Weekly, which stated, "intriguing characters, an imaginative setting, and evocative writing combine to create a spellbinding tale of love, loss, sacrifice, and hope", while Caitlin Paxson of NPR wrote that "ultimately, the message of Caraval ends up muddled." Caraval was on The New York Times bestseller list for fifteen weeks, reaching No. 2. Film rights to Caraval were optioned by Twentieth Century Fox.

Legendary was on The New York Times bestseller list for eight weeks, peaking at No. 1. Kirkus Reviews criticized Legendary's "weak plot and ultraviolet prose" but praised it as "a tour de force of imagination." School Library Journal wrote, "While this second installment does not stand on its own—readers will need to be familiar with the characters, events, and world-building of the previous book to fully understand and appreciate this one—fans will be delighted to spend more time with Tella, Dante, and Scarlett, and to immerse themselves again into Garber's magical world".

The third book in the Caraval trilogy, Finale, was reviewed by Kirkus as "overwritten, with overly convenient worldbuilding that struggles nearly as much as the overwrought prose and convoluted plot".

Garber's novel Once Upon A Broken Heart, was published September 28, 2021. Kirkus Reviews wrote that it is, "a lushly written story with an intriguing heart". Publishers Weekly praised Garber's worldbuilding.

Works

Caraval trilogy 

 Caraval. Flatiron Books, 2017.
 Legendary. Flatiron Books, 2018.
 Finale. Flatiron Books, 2019.

Once Upon a Broken Heart 

This saga is set in the same universe of The Caraval trilogy.

 Once Upon a Broken Heart. Flatiron Books, 2021.
 The Ballad of Never After. Flatiron Books, 2022.

References

Further reading 

 Bircher, Katie. Review of Caraval. Horn Book. March–April 2017. p. 88.
"Stephanie Garber." Contemporary Authors. Via Gale Literature.

External links 
Official website

American writers of young adult literature
American young adult novelists
Living people
21st-century American novelists
American women novelists
Year of birth missing (living people)
21st-century American women writers